Harbir Singh Sandhu (born 27 March 1990) is an Indian field hockey player who plays as a defender.

Sandhu was first selected for the national team for the 2012 Men's Hockey Champions Trophy. He was part of India's provisional delegation for the 2014 Commonwealth Games but was denied accreditation after a background check by the United Kingdom Home Office.

References

1990 births
Living people
Field hockey players from Amritsar
Indian male field hockey players